John Charles Pierce (born January 11, 1959) is an American operatic tenor and academic voice teacher. He made an international career based in Germany, and focused on Wagner roles such as Tannhäuser, Lohengrin and Tristan.

Career 
Pierce was born in Woodstock, Illinois, to parents who were both music professionals. He studied at the University of Illinois at Urbana-Champaign to 1982, with William Warfield, Grace Wilson and John Wustman, graduating as a Master of Music. He began his career as a baritone, but turned to the heldentenor repertoire, and won the Wagner-Preis of the Liederkranz Foundation Competition in New York City in 1992.

In 1992, he moved with his family to Germany where he became a member of the Staatstheater Cottbus. In 2002, he turned to freelance singing. He appeared at international opera houses. In 2004, he appeared in the title role of Friedrich Cerha's Der Rattenfänger at the Wiener Festwochen. He performed the title role of Wagner's Tannhäuser at the Stadttheater Minden in October 2005, and of Lohengrin in 2009. He appeared as Tristan first at the Opernhaus Dortmund in 2000, and performed the role internationally, including in Prague, Rio de Janeiro, Innsbruck, Rotterdam, and at the 2010 .

Pierce has also been active as a concert singer, performing oratorios such as Handel's Messiah,  Mozart's Requiem, Beethoven's Ninth Symphony, Dvořák's Requiem and Verdi's Requiem. He has performed lieder, such as Schubert's Die Winterreise with accompanist John Wustmann.

Pierce was extraordinary professor of voice at the University of Michigan School of Music. He has lectured at the Department of Music at the University of Minnesota Duluth.

Repertoire 
Pierce has appeared in operatic roles including:
 Florestan – Fidelio (Beethoven)

 Tony – West Side Story (Bernstein)
 Don José – Carmen (Bizet)
 Peter Grimes – Peter Grimes (Britten)
 Laca Klemeň/Števa Buryja – Jenůfa (Janáček)
 Boris – Katja Kabanowa (Janáček)
 Hoffmann – Hoffmanns Erzählungen (Offenbach)

 Samson – Samson et Dalila (Saint-Saëns)
 Bursche – Das Spielwerk (Franz Schreker)

 Herman – Pique Dame (Tchaikovsky)
 Otello – Otello (Verdi)
 Loge – Das Rheingold (Wagner)
 Erik – Der fliegende Holländer (Wagner)

 Lohengrin – Lohengrin (Wagner)
 Parsifal – Parsifal (Wagner)
 Tannhäuser – Tannhäuser (Wagner)
 Tristan – Tristan und Isolde (Wagner)
 Max – Der Freischütz (Weber)

Awards 
 1999 Max-Grünebaum-Preis of the 
 Honorary member of the Internationale Hans-von-Bülow-Gesellschaft

References

External links 
 
 John Pierce johncharlespierce.weebly.com
 Interview with John Pierce from 2009

American operatic tenors
1959 births
Living people
University of Michigan faculty